As of November 2017, Austrian leisure airline Niki served the following scheduled destinations. Niki restructured its route network in early 2017, decreasing from 34 to 20 destinations. Shortly after, a takeover of several Air Berlin leisure routes from Germany and Switzerland was announced. Niki declared bankruptcy and ceased all operations on 13 December 2017.

Destinations

Africa
Egypt
 Marsa Alam - Marsa Alam International Airport

Morocco
 Agadir - Al Massira Airport
 Marrakesh - Marrakesh Menara Airport

Europe
Austria
 Graz - Graz Airport
 Innsbruck - Innsbruck Airport
 Salzburg - Salzburg Airport
 Vienna - Vienna International Airport base

Cyprus
 Larnaca - Larnaca International Airport

Germany
 Berlin – Berlin Tegel Airport focus city
 Cologne/Bonn – Cologne Bonn Airport focus city
 Dresden – Dresden Airport
 Düsseldorf – Düsseldorf Airport focus city
 Frankfurt – Frankfurt Airport
 Hamburg – Hamburg Airport focus city
 Hanover – Hannover Airport
 Karlsruhe/Baden-Baden – Karlsruhe/Baden-Baden Airport
 Leipzig/Halle – Leipzig/Halle Airport
 Munich – Munich Airport focus city
 Nuremberg – Nuremberg Airport focus city
 Paderborn/Lippstadt – Paderborn Lippstadt Airport
 Saarbrücken – Saarbrücken Airport
 Stuttgart – Stuttgart Airport focus city

Greece
 Kalamata - Kalamata International Airport seasonal

Iceland
 Reykjavík - Keflavik International Airport seasonal

Italy
 Catania - Catania–Fontanarossa Airport

Portugal
 Faro – Faro Airport
 Funchal – Madeira Airport
 Ponta Delgada – João Paulo II Airport

Spain
 Fuerteventura - Fuerteventura Airport
 Ibiza - Ibiza Airport seasonal
 Lanzarote - Lanzarote Airport
 Las Palmas - Gran Canaria Airport
 Málaga - Málaga Airport
 Palma de Mallorca - Palma de Mallorca Airport
 Tenerife - Tenerife South Airport

Switzerland
 Basel - EuroAirport
 Zürich - Zürich Airport focus city

References

Lists of airline destinations